"Madman" is an unfinished song that was recorded by the Beatles in January 1969 during the Get Back sessions.

Recording
Although the song was introduced during the Get Back sessions that would eventually become the Let It Be album, it was never completed at that time.  Between the two known recordings of the song during Beatles sessions, Lennon moved the lyrics around and altered its arrangement. A similarity between this song and Lennon's "Mean Mr. Mustard" from the album Abbey Road has been noted.

Personnel
John Lennon – lead vocal, electric piano
Paul McCartney – lead guitar
Ringo Starr – drums

References

The Beatles songs
1969 songs
Songs written by Lennon–McCartney
Song recordings produced by George Martin
Unfinished musical compositions